was a pre-World War II plan for the invasion of Czechoslovakia by Nazi Germany. Although some preliminary steps were taken to destabilise Czechoslovakia, the plan was never fully realised since Nazi Germany achieved its objective by diplomatic means at the Munich Conference in September 1938, followed by the unopposed military occupation of Bohemia and Moravia and the creation of a nominally independent Slovakia, in March 1939.

Background
First drafted in late 1937, the plan was then revised as the military situation and requirements changed. The last revision of the plan scheduled the attack for 28 September 1938. However, as France and the United Kingdom were reluctant to go to war for the sake of Czechoslovakia and both expressed political will to appease Germany, the execution of the plan was postponed. After the Munich Conference produced the Munich Agreement on 30 September 1938, the plan was abandoned altogether.

In ceding the border areas to Germany, Poland and Hungary, Czechoslovakia lost the majority of its border fortifications and became less defensible against any invading force. On 13 March 1939, Adolf Hitler and Joachim von Ribbentrop informed Jozef Tiso about the irreversible decision to occupy Bohemia and Moravia in the coming hours, while Slovakia was to decide on its fate itself. After the proclamation of the Slovak Republic shortly after the end of Nazi ultimatum, Hitler invited the Czech president Emil Hácha declaring that the German army was about to invade the Czech lands and the resistance would be suppressed by Nazis by all means. On 15 March, Germany occupied the remaining Czech part, and established the Protectorate of Bohemia and Moravia. The name  was later assigned to the plans for an invasion of Ireland.

Psychological warfare
The plans of  had a large role for psychological warfare, both within Czechoslovakia and against Czechoslovakia's allies. Internally, the Czechoslovak government and citizenship were supposed to be intimidated and have their will to defend themselves broken, and the ethnic German minority (which was largely pro-German and pro-Nazi), was supposed to internally weaken and disrupt the country. Internationally, co-ordinated Nazi psychological and propaganda warfare aimed at making the country isolated to the point that it would stand alone against any aggression, with defence having no hope. Modern media, especially radio, played key role in the Nazi psychological warfare. Within Czechoslovakia, Nazi Germany also relied on using the Sudeten German Party as well as its paramilitary organization the Freiwilliger Schutzdienst.

Undeclared German-Czechoslovak war
The organisation was sheltered, trained and equipped by German authorities and conducted cross-border terrorist operations into Czechoslovakian territory. Relying on the Convention for the Definition of Aggression, Czechoslovak President Edvard Beneš and the Czechoslovak government-in-exile later regarded 17 September 1938 to be the beginning of the undeclared German-Czechoslovak war. That understanding has been assumed also by the Constitutional Court of the Czech Republic in 1997.

See also
 List of Axis operational codenames in the European Theatre

References

External links
 Hitler's directive for "Operation Green"

Cancelled military operations involving Germany
Cancelled invasions
Cancelled military operations of World War II
Munich Agreement
Czechoslovakia–Germany relations